Located in Mercer Island, Washington, Northwest Yeshiva High School is the state's only accredited, co-ed, college preparatory, dual-curriculum Jewish High School.

History

Northwest Yeshiva was founded  in 1974 to incubate a Jewish environment for higher college preparatory learning in the region. Originally, it was housed in the basement of the Seattle Hebrew Academy.  In 1992, it moved to Mercer Island, Washington to the campus that it occupies today. Rabbi Bernie Fox retired in 2016 as Head of School after 31 years in the position.  Jason Feld, former dean of students at Shalhevet High School in Los Angeles, assumed the role of Head of School in July 2017.

Facilities

The school's campus includes a sanctuary for prayer, multifunctional classrooms, STEM Lab, science and computer labs, a lunchroom, and an outdoor sport court.

Curriculum

Northwest Yeshiva's curriculum is integrated, encompassing both Judaic studies, including comprehensive Torah study that emphasis the development of critical thinking skills, as well as College Preparatory Academics.

The school is accredited by the Northwest Accreditation Commission (NWAC).

Judaic Studies
In 2019, Rabbi Naftali Rothstein joined the faculty as the Campus Rabbi. Rabbi Dr. Jeremy Wieder, a Rosh Yeshiva at Yeshiva University, is the school's Halachic (Jewish law) authority.

College Preparatory Studies

NYHS offers College in the High School courses in which students can earn University of Washington college credit. Currently, NYHS offers this option for Calculus A & B, Biology, Expository Writing, Environmental Science and Human Physiology. Freshmen have the opportunity to take a full STEM (Science, Technology, Engineering, Math) curriculum thanks to NYHS's partnership with the Center for the Initiatives in Jewish Education and the SAMIS Foundation.

NYHS students and faculty engage in monthly Town Halls, open to the public. The student led, Agenda Committee, organizes and guides the civil discourse opportunities. Topics are proposed by the student body and often are focused on school and communal issues. 

Israel and Experiential Studies

Learning about and supporting the centrality of the State of Israel in Jewish life today is a key component of an NYHS education. Students travel to Israel and Poland during their senior year to participate on the March of the Living.

In 2022, NYHS seniors were the first teen group in the United States to volunteer with NCSY Relief  in Romania at the Tikva House with Ukrainian refugee and orphans who had fled Odessa, Ukraine.

Athletics

A member of the Washington Interscholastic Activities Association (WIAA), within the State Class IB, Northwest Yeshiva competes in multiple sports. The school changed its team name from the 613s, a reference to the Torah's total number of mitzvot or commandments, to the Lions in memory of Ari Grashin Z"L, a student of NYHS who died in 2002–Ari being the Hebrew word for lion.

The Lions compete in men's basketball, women's basketball, women's volleyball, and co-ed cross-country, golf, and track.

In 2010, a WIAA State Girls' Basketball Tournament conflicted with Purim's Fast of Esther. The school's team, who had made it to State for the first time, had to balance religious obligations with playing and, in the end, decided there would be "no forfeit of faith," garnering significant media coverage.
 Again in 2011, a WIAA State Girls' Volleyball Tournament conflicted, this time with Sabbath. Northwest's team once again decided "no forfeit of faith."

In 2022, the Men's Lions basketball team competed in the Washington State Championship and placed 5th overall.

Affiliations

 Jewish Federation of Greater Seattle
 Samis Foundation

References

External links
 

Schools in Seattle
High schools in King County, Washington
Jewish schools
Private high schools in Washington (state)
Orthodox yeshivas in the United States
Jewish day schools in Washington (state)